Samsudin bin Abu Hassan is a Malaysian politician and served as Perak State Executive Councillor.

Election Results

Honours
  :
  Knight Commander of the Order of the Perak State Crown (DPMP) - Dato' (2005)
  Knight of the Order of Cura Si Manja Kini (DPCM) - Dato' (2017)

References

Living people
People from Perak
Malaysian people of Malay descent
Malaysian Muslims
United Malays National Organisation politicians
Members of the Perak State Legislative Assembly
Perak state executive councillors
21st-century Malaysian politicians
Year of birth missing (living people)